Tianhenan Station, formerly Tianhe 1st Road South Station during planning, is a metro station on the Guangzhou Metro APM line. It is located under the interchange of Tianhe 1st South Road and Liuyun 2nd Street in the Tianhe District. It started operation on 8November 2010. The station is unique in being the only station in Guangzhou with no escalator access to the platforms - instead 4 lifts carry passengers from the concourse to the platform although there is a staircase for emergency use.

Station layout

Exits

References

Railway stations in China opened in 2010
Guangzhou Metro stations in Tianhe District